Peibo Clafrog (alternatively, Pepiau Glavorawc, or in Latin, Pepianus Spumosus), was King of Ergyng in south-east Wales in the 5th or 6th century. He is chiefly known from the legends of Saint Dubricius, who was supposedly his grandson. The contemporary rendering of this name would seem to be Peibio, as in Garthbeibio, a parish in Montgomeryshire, or Ynys Beibio, near Holyhead.

Life of Dubricius
Peibo Clafrog appears in the Life of Dubricius included in the 12th-century Book of Llandaff or Liber Landavensis as well as in a number of works derived from it, and in charters associated with Dubricius. He is consistently described as Dubricius' maternal grandfather.

In the Life, Peibio is King of Ergyng and has a daughter, Efrddyl. He is afflicted with a mouth ailment that causes him to drivel saliva constantly. This is supposed to be the cause of his epithet Clafrog, though this term literally means "scabby" or "leprous"; there has evidently been some confusion with the similar-sounding Glyfoer or Glafoer, meaning "drivel". Returning from a skirmish one day, Peibo asks his daughter to help him wash his head. In the process he discovers that she is pregnant. Furious, he orders her to be tied in a sack and drowned in a river. When she washes ashore, he then orders her burnt alive. The next day, however, his servants discover that she has miraculously survived the ordeal and is contently nursing her newborn baby on top of the pyre. The regretful Peibio then orders Efrddyl and her child brought to him; the child's touch instantly cures his affliction. In thanks Peibio bestows his grandson with the place of his extraordinary birth, called Matle (Madley), and eventually a monument commemorating the event is erected. "[John] Lewis, in his History of Great Britain describes the monument of this Prince as existing in his time. 'In Herefordshire in a parish (probably he means Madley) is the picture of a King, with a man on each side of him, with napkins wiping the rheum and drivel from his mouth; that humour so abounding in him that he could get no cure for it, which King, the country people call King Driveller, the Britons Pebiau Glavorawc, the Latins Pepianus Spumosus, Rex Ereychi.'"

From the similarity of the names it is possible that Pepiau and Pabiali, the son of Brychan, were the same person, which would make Dubricius a great-grandson of Brychan — a great distance between the respective eras. Dubricius' mother could not have been the daughter of Meyrig, the son of Tewdrig, as Meyrig died in 575 at the age of 90 while Dubricius was born in 475, was consecrated bishop in 505 and died in 560 at the age of 85. In the genealogies in the Jesus College MS 20 of the fifteenth century, Peibo is called Peibiawn Glawrawc, and is reckoned to be the son of Arbeth and the father of Tewdwr.

Peibio was also the uncle of Saint Inabwy, disciple of Dubricius and Bishop of Ergyng.

Possible alternative identities
According to the tale of Culhwch and Olwen, there were two kings named Nynnio and Peibio who were metamorphosed into horned oxen on account of their sins. They appear as insane kings, who were brothers in the tale of Rhitta Gawr.

Notes

References

6th-century rulers in Europe
Monarchs of Ergyng
6th-century Welsh people